The European Championship B (formerly the European Shield), is a rugby league football competition. The competition is organised by the Rugby League European Federation and is the second tier of the European Championship competition. It was first held in 2006 as the Central Europe Development Tri-Nations.

History
The competition was first held in 2006 under the name of Central Europe Development Tri Nations, with the aim of developing teams in central and eastern Europe. Up until 2009 the competition was made up of only three teams until  it was expanded in 2010 to six teams split into two conferences; East and West. In 2011 the competition was reverted to three teams with Norway and Malta making their debuts. The competition was expanded again the year after though with four teams playing in winter between 2012–13. This was repeated again in the 2014–15 edition of the competition and was used for qualification for the 2017 World Cup. The 2018 competition was the last year of its current incarnation after a two-year hiatus. In 2020, it was announced promotion and relegation would be introduced with three teams in each division, with the top team being promoted and the bottom relegated.

Team appearances

Results

Championship era (2006–2018)

Promotion and relegation era (2020–present)

Summary

Overall performances by season
This list shows the performances of all teams from all four divisions of the European Championships during the promotion and relegation era only.
 – Champions
 – Runners-up
 – Promoted
 – No movement
 – Relegated

See also

 Rugby League European Championship A
 Rugby League European Championship C
 Rugby League European Championship D
 Women's Rugby League European Championship
 Wheelchair Rugby League European Championship

Notes

References

External links

Rugby league international tournaments
European rugby league competitions